Sabrina Wu is an American writer, comedian, and actor. They were a staff writer for the Disney+ series Doogie Kameāloha, M.D. Wu acts in a lead role in the upcoming Adele Lim film Joy Ride. They were named a 2022 Just for Laughs New Face of Comedy.

Life and career 
Wu was born and raised in Ann Arbor, Michigan. Their parents immigrated to the United States from China. Wu attended high school at Greenhills School and played on the basketball team. They first became interested in comedy at age 16 after watching Gabriel Iglesias' Hot and Fluffy special and began performing stand-up at high school talent shows.

They continued to perform stand-up comedy as an undergraduate student at Harvard University and were co-president of the Harvard College Stand-Up Society. Wu took one semester off to intern for The Daily Show. They graduated with a degree in psychology in 2020.

Wu's first screenwriting job was as a staff writer for the first season of the Disney+ series Doogie Kameāloha, M.D. They performed a stand-up set on The Tonight Show in 2022.

Wu is a lead character in the 2023 feature film Joy Ride opposite Stephanie Hsu, Ashley Park, and Sherry Cola. They also act in a main role in the upcoming Lauren Ludwig comedy pilot for FX.

Wu resides in Brooklyn. They are nonbinary.

Accolades 
 2022, Just for Laughs New Face of Comedy

References

External links 
 
 Sabrina Wu on Instagram

Year of birth missing (living people)
Living people
American stand-up comedians
American writers of Chinese descent
American non-binary actors
American non-binary writers
American comedians of Asian descent
American LGBT people of Asian descent
LGBT people from Michigan
American LGBT comedians
21st-century American comedians
Harvard University alumni
Non-binary comedians
Actors from Ann Arbor, Michigan
Writers from Ann Arbor, Michigan